Heinz Steinberger (born February 14, 1958) is a former ice speed skater from Austria. He represented his native country in two Winter Olympics - 1976 in Innsbruck and 1984 in Sarajevo.

References

External links
 
 SkateResults

1958 births
Living people
Austrian male speed skaters
Speed skaters at the 1976 Winter Olympics
Speed skaters at the 1984 Winter Olympics
Olympic speed skaters of Austria
Place of birth missing (living people)